Nurul Islam is a Bangladesh Awami League politician and the former Member of Parliament of Mymensingh-3.

Career
Islam was elected to parliament from Mymensingh-3 as a Bangladesh Awami League candidate in 1973.

References

Awami League politicians
Living people
1st Jatiya Sangsad members
Year of birth missing (living people)